Paul Michael Nicholson (born 10 May 1979) is an English former professional darts player who played in events of the Professional Darts Corporation (PDC). He won a major event, the 2010 Players Championship Finals, where he defeated Mervyn King in the final. He was also the runner-up to Phil Taylor in the 2011 Championship League Darts, and part of the Australia team which lost a sudden death shoot-out to England in the 2012 PDC World Cup of Darts final.

Nicholson also acts as a sports commentator and TV and radio pundit. He was nicknamed "The Asset", and was known for coming on to the stage with sunglasses, and was also known for his Wrestling-style walk ons, using the song "Club Foot" as his walk on music for most of his career. Nicholson had a feud with Phil Taylor during the 2011 UK Open, in which he supposedly "waved goodbye" to Taylor after beating him in a sudden death leg to reach the quarter-finals.

Career

2008/2009
Before joining the PDC Pro Tour, Nicholson was one of the top players in the Australian Grand Prix circuit, winning 15 titles in 2008. His performances led him to the top of the DPA rankings and earned him a spot in the 2008 Grand Slam of Darts. He was drawn in Group H with Kevin Painter, Darryl Fitton and WDF number one Gary Anderson. Nicholson caused a surprise, as he beat Anderson 5–4 in his opening group game. This was despite constant booing from the crowd, who began chanting "Who Are You?" during his walk-on and after his first three darts which was a maximum 180, he put his finger to his mouth at the crowd which caused the crowd to boo him almost every time he threw his darts. Despite beating Anderson, losses to Fitton and Painter eliminated him at the group stage.

Nicholson earned qualification for the 2009 PDC World Darts Championship through the DPA rankings. He defeated Adrian Gray in the first round, winning all nine legs for a three sets to nil victory. He then beat world number 6 Adrian Lewis in the second round 4–3 and then came from two sets down to beat world number 11 Dennis Priestley 4–2 to advance to the quarter finals. In the quarter-finals, he lost to world number 3 at the time, James Wade but his tournament performance lifted him into the top 50 on the PDC Order of Merit.

After his performance in the World Championship, Nicholson decided to leave the DPA and play in the PDC Pro Tour in an attempt to qualify for the UK Open. His last 16 place in the Southern Regional finals ensured his qualification for the tournament.  He beat Gary Anderson 6 legs to 4 in the second round, before losing 9–7 to pub qualifier Ken Mather, whereafter his relationship with the crowd soured further, claiming Mather's crowd had repeatedly shouted out while he was throwing. After the match as the crowd chanted "who are you" directed at Nicholson, he responded using profanity towards the crowd which he was later fined for by the DRA.

Nicholson reached the semi-final of the PDPA Players Championship Barnsley 2, defeating Gary Mawson, Mark Dudbridge, John MaGowan, Justin Pipe and Denis Ovens before losing out to Colin Osborne, the eventual winner. Nicholson did not enter the qualifiers for the Las Vegas Desert Classic and failed to qualify for the World Matchplay.

2010
In 2010, Nicholson claimed his first PDC title, The Totesport Player's Championship. He had to play the quarter-final, the semi-final and the final in the same day. In the quarter-final he defeated Adrian Lewis 9–7. He then overcame reigning champion Phil Taylor 10–9 in the semi-finals, and followed this up with a 13–11 victory over Mervyn King in the final. During the latter stages of the tournament, the crowd started to support Nicholson due to his efforts against higher ranked and more experienced opponents (in particular Taylor), and as a result he relaxed his behaviour leading many pundits such as Alan Warriner-Little to suggest that he might give up the 'bad boy' image and just be himself. In March 2010, he moved into the top 16 of the PDC Order of merit for the first time. In the UK Open 2010, he beat Kirk Shepherd 9–6 in the third round, and 7–9 to Gary Anderson in the fourth round. On his World Matchplay debut, he lost 3–10 to Steve Beaton in the first round.

2011
In the 2011 World Championship, Nicholson continued reached the second round. He won his first title since January 2010 by winning the Crawley Players Championship (1) by defeating Adrian Lewis 6–4. He also came through a semi final clash with Gary Anderson defeating him 6–5.

At the 2011 UK Open, Nicholson won final-leg deciders against Gary Anderson in round four, and Phil Taylor in round five, to reach the quarter-finals. He lost 7–10 to eventual champion James Wade.

At the 2011 World Matchplay, Nicholson defeated Colin Osborne in the first round to secure a second-round match with Raymond van Barneveld.

At the 2011 Championship League Darts, Nicholson lost 6–1 to Phil Taylor in the final.

2012

Nicholson made it to the last 16 of the 2012 World Championship by recording 3–1 and 4–0 victories over Mensur Suljović and Alan Tabern respectively. He next played Belgian Kim Huybrechts and won the first set, before losing 12 of the next 14 legs to exit the tournament 1–4. He hit 21% of his doubles in the match.

After losing in the final of the Spanish Players Championship, Nicholson partnered Simon Whitlock again for the 2012 PDC World Cup of Darts. Together they had victories over Ireland, Belgium and the Netherlands to reach their first World Cup final, where they played the English pair of Phil Taylor and Adrian Lewis. Australia found themselves 0–3 down in the final, meaning that Nicholson had to beat Lewis in the last singles match and then win the doubles to force the tie to a sudden-death leg for the World Cup crown. Australia won both of the matches 7–4 and in the sudden-death leg Whitlock and Nicholson both missed two darts each to secure the title, with Lewis hitting the winning double for England. After the match Nicholson vowed that Australia would win the title in the future.

In June, Nicholson missed ten darts to reach the quarter-finals of the UK Open as he lost 8–9 to Denis Ovens in the last 16. In the World Matchplay he was beaten 6–10 by Andy Smith. 
After his 0–6 first round defeat to Andy Hamilton in the European Championship he did some commentating for ESPN who were broadcasting the tournament in the UK. At the World Grand Prix he beat Michael Mansell and Colin Osborne to reach his first quarter-final in the event. He faced Wes Newton and led 2–0 in sets, but was unable to take out 106 for a straight sets win and instead went on to lose 2–3. In October, he reached his first final since the World Cup in February at the fifth European Tour Event of the year, the Dutch Darts Masters. His run included a win over Michael van Gerwen, who had won four tournaments in the previous two months and a semi-final victory over Wayne Jones who beat Phil Taylor in the previous round. He faced compatriot Whitlock in a first all Australian final on the PDC ProTour and lost 1–6, admitting afterwards that he had run out of steam by the conclusion of the tournament. At the Grand Slam of Darts, Nicholson lost two out of his three Group F games to finish third in the table and fail to qualify for the last 16. After all 33 ProTour events of 2012 had been played, Nicholson was 18th on the Order of Merit, inside the top 32 who qualified for the Players Championship Finals. He missed one dart in the deciding leg against Ronnie Baxter in the first round, losing 5–6.

2013
Nicholson lost in the second round of the 2013 World Championship to Robert Thornton. He survived a total of five match darts from Thornton to take the match into a sudden death leg, which he lost. Nicholson never had a dart to win himself but did throw for the match during the final set. In his third World Cup of Darts with Simon Whitlock the pair were beaten in the last 16 when the Belgian brothers of Ronny and Kim Huybrechts defeated them 1–5.
On 16 & 17 March 2013, Nicholson had wins over Dave Chisnall, Ross Smith, Darren Whittingham, Louis Blundell, Kim Huybrechts, Brendan Dolan, Co Stompé, Richie Burnett and Ronnie Baxter to secure back-to-back quarter final spots in the Speedy Services UK Open Qualifier 3 & Qualifier 4 events in Wigan. He was then whitewashed by Michael van Gerwen 6–0 in the quarter-final of Qualifier 3 and lost to 6–5 Gary Anderson the following day in the quarter-final of Qualifier 4.
Nicholson competed a few weeks later at the European Darts Trophy in Sindelfingen, Germany. He saw off Ronny Huybrechts 6–5 in the first round before coming back from 5–1 down to defeat Colin Lloyd in the last 32. He then claimed wins over Dean Winstanley and Mark Webster to secure a semi-final clash with world number three Michael van Gerwen. He saw off van Gerwen 6–2 to face Wes Newton in the final. Nicholson missed nine darts to lead 5–3 and in the deciding leg had three darts to win the tournament on 24, but hit a single 12 with his first and burst his score by hitting a single 13 with his second and lost the match 5–6. He reached another final in May at the third Players Championship but was defeated 4–6 by Jamie Caven.

Nicholson lost 9–5 to John Bowles in the third round of the UK Open. In the opening round of the World Matchplay he saw 4–1 and 8–7 leads over Dave Chisnall turn into a 10–8 defeat and was in tears on the stage during the final leg. Nicholson said later that the feeling of not having enough during the match was too much to handle, but hoped the experience would be a starting point for a new phase in his career.
He reached the last 16 of the Grand Slam of Darts losing heavily to James Wade 10–1.

2014
Nicholson beat Stuart Kellett 3–0 in the opening round of the 2014 World Championship, but Kevin Painter beat Nicholson 4–0 in the subsequent round. He co-commentated on the final, for BBC Radio 5 Live. Nicholson lost 9–5 to Terry Jenkins in the UK Open fourth round. Nicholson and Whitlock won through to the semi-finals of the World Cup of Darts where they faced England's Phil Taylor and Adrian Lewis in a repeat of 2012's final. Whitlock was beaten 4–1 by Taylor, before Nicholson overcame Lewis 4–2 to mean a doubles match was required to settle the tie which Australia lost 4–0. Nicholson overcame Robert Thornton 10–8 in the first round of the World Matchplay, explaining later that his form had suffered over the previous months due to pains in his neck and shoulders which he has worked with an acupuncturist to help relieve. In the second round, Wes Newton fought back from 5–0 and 8–3 deficits and went on to survive five match darts from Nicholson to knock him out 15–13. This was the last major Nicholson played in during the year as he failed to qualify for the World Grand Prix, European Championship, Grand Slam and Players Championship Finals.

2015
Nicholson walked onto the stage without sunglasses for the first time in his career at the 2015 World Championship in a further attempt to move away from his bad boy of darts image. His first round match against Benito van de Pas went to a deciding set in which Nicholson lost all three legs to exit the tournament. He left his darts on the stage afterwards and said that he was unsure what he would do in the future. He returned to play the full schedule of events and qualified for the third round of the 2015 UK Open in which he drew Michael van Gerwen and lost 9–3. In the quarter-finals of the World Cup Nicholson knew a win over Belgium's Kim Huybrechts would see Australia reach the semis. He was 3–0 up but then missed a total of six match darts which led to him losing 4–3. Australia then lost the deciding doubles match 4–2. Nicholson failed to qualify for another PDC major event and could not get past the last 16 of any Pro Tour tournament. He fell outside the top 32 on the Order of Merit during the year and after losing in the first round of the qualifier it meant that missed out on playing in the World Championship for the first time since the 2008 event.

2016
Nicholson failed to qualify for the 2016 UK Open for the first time since the 2008 event. He reached the last 16 of one event all year, the 13th Players Championship, by beating Nathan Aspinall, Kyle Anderson (the player who has replaced him in Australia's World Cup team) and Simon Whitlock, but he then lost 6–1 to Benito van de Pas. He began commentating for the PDC during European Tour events and also for the BBC in the inaugural Champions League of Darts.

2017
Nicholson was a studio analyst and commentator on Channel 4's coverage of the 2017 BDO World Darts Championship. He was ranked 84th after the 2017 PDC World Championship and played in Q School to try and win his place on the tour back. He lost in the final round of the third day to Richie Burnett, before going all the way on the last day to earn a two-year Tour Card.

The rest of Nicholson’s year was good enough to give him enough ranking money to qualify for the 2017 Players Championship Finals, although being the 59th seed meant he had to play Michael van Gerwen and lost 6–3.

2018

Nicholson, needing a good year to hold on to his tour card, made a good start by qualifying for the UK Open, where he eventually lost to Paul Hogan 10–6 in the third round.

He continued his form by winning through to a European tour semi-final, where he was beaten by Adrian Lewis; this run effectively sealed his spot in the European Championships, as the 32nd seed, and the World Championships, due to there being more spots open to Pro Tour qualifiers this year.

Nicholson made his return to the European Championship, where he was up against the top seed Michael van Gerwen. He made a good account of himself by opening with back-to-back twelve-darters with a 127 checkout on the bullseye, but failed to hit darts to go 3–2 up, and failed to win another leg; he lost 6–2.

2019

He announced on 11 January that he will not attend the 2019 PDC Q School in an attempt to renew his tour card. He insisted he needed to work on his darts, game and head in order to get himself ready for 2020.

2020
Ahead of Q-School, Nicholson announced that he will no longer be representing Australia in an interview with the BDO

Feud with Phil Taylor
In the 2011 UK Open, Nicholson defeated Phil Taylor in the last 16 by 9 legs to 8 and supposedly waved goodbye to him. While being interviewed at that year's World Matchplay, Nicholson spoke of Taylor's reaction and stated that when they met again, if Taylor did not bring his 'A' game he would "put him to bed". Nicholson defended the gesture saying: 'I was waving bye-bye to the demons which had dogged me in too many televised tournaments'. The comments garnered much media attention.

Taylor reacted angrily to Nicholson's comments, telling BBC Radio Stoke, "I think he's very, very silly." Taylor added that Nicholson "has a big mouth and won't keep it shut". He played Taylor in an eagerly anticipated match at the 2011 European Darts Championships and was beaten 10–7, despite being 7–6 ahead. He was then defeated at the 2011 World Grand Prix by Taylor 3–0.

CM Punk Association
During his walk-on in his second-round match against Raymond van Barneveld in the 2011 World Matchplay, Nicholson mimicked former WWE wrestler CM Punk by having X's marked on his hands, and also lifted up a Nexus scarf. However, he lost the match, 13–9. Then, when he met Phil Taylor, he once again mimicked CM Punk during his walk-on, using his signature pose on one knee, shouting "It's clobberin' time" and punching the air. During Taylor's walk-on, Nicholson sat Indian-style on the stage, another trait of CM Punk, in an attempt to anger Taylor.

Career finals

PDC major finals: 2 (1 title, 1 runner-up)

PDC team finals: 1 (1 runner-up)

World Championship results

PDC

 2009: Quarter-finals (lost to James Wade 3–5)  
 2010: First round (lost to Terry Jenkins 2–3)
 2011: Second round (lost to Peter Wright 2–4)
 2012: Third round (lost to Kim Huybrechts 1–4)
 2013: Second round (lost to Robert Thornton 3–4)
 2014: Second round (lost to Kevin Painter 0–4)
 2015: First round (lost to Benito van de Pas 2–3)
2019: First round (lost to Kevin Burness 0–3)

Performance timeline

References

External links
Official Website

Interview with Paul Nicholson
Management website

Living people
1979 births
Professional Darts Corporation former tour card holders
Australian darts players
English darts players
Players Championship Finals champions
PDC World Cup of Darts Australian team
Darts commentators